The 1969 ABA Playoffs was the postseason tournament of the American Basketball Association's 1968–69 season. The tournament concluded with the Western Division champion Oakland Oaks defeating the Eastern Division champion Indiana Pacers, four games to one in the ABA Finals.  Warren Jabali of the Oaks was named the Playoff MVP.

Notable events

The Oakland Oaks won the ABA championship after finishing with the league's best record during the regular season (60-18, .769).  The Pittsburgh Pipers had accomplished the same feat the year prior.

Rick Barry, now eligible to play for the Oaks after being forced to sit out the previous season, averaged 34.0 points during the regular season.  However, Barry only played 35 regular season games before injuring a knee and missing the playoffs.

The Oaks, like the Pittsburgh Pipers before them, did not play in the following season as the same team.  The Oakland Oaks became the Washington Caps for the 1969-1970 ABA season; the Pittsburgh Pipers had become the Minnesota Pipers after winning the ABA championship the prior season.

The Oaks' 60-18 (.769) record in this season was the best in ABA history until the Kentucky Colonels finished the 1971-1972 season with a record of 68-16 (.810), a record that was never surpassed.

Warren Jabali of Oakland was the Most Valuable Player of the ABA playoffs.

Western Division

Champion:  Oakland Oaks

Division Semifinals

(1) Oakland Oaks vs. (3) Denver Rockets:
Oaks win series 4-3
Game 1 @ Oakland:  Oakland 129, Denver 99
Game 2 @ Oakland:  Denver 122, Oakland 119
Game 3 @ Denver:  Oakland 121, Denver 99
Game 4 @ Denver:  Denver 109, Oakland 108
Game 5 @ Oakland:  Oakland 128, Denver 118
Game 6 @ Denver:  Denver 126, Oakland 115
Game 7 @ Oakland:  Oakland 115, Denver 102

(2) New Orleans Buccaneers vs. (4) Dallas Chaparrals:
Bucs win series 4-3
Game 1 @ New Orleans:  New Orleans 129, Dallas 106
Game 2 @ New Orleans:  New Orleans 122, Dallas 108
Game 3 @ Dallas:  Dallas 130, New Orleans 106
Game 4 @ Dallas:  New Orleans 114, Dallas 107
Game 5 @ New Orleans:  Dallas 123, New Orleans 112
Game 6 @ Dallas:  Dallas 136, New Orleans 118
Game 7 @ New Orleans:  New Orleans 101, Dallas 95

Division Finals

(1) Oakland Oaks vs. (2) New Orleans Buccaneers:
Oaks win series 4-0
Game 1 @ Oakland:  Oakland 128, New Orleans 118
Game 2 @ Oakland:  Oakland 135, New Orleans 124
Game 3 @ New Orleans:  Oakland 113, New Orleans 107
Game 4 @ New Orleans:  Oakland 128, New Orleans 114

Eastern Division

Champion:  Indiana Pacers

Division Semifinals

(1) Indiana Pacers vs. (3) Kentucky Colonels:
Pacers win series 4-3
Game 1 @ Indiana:  Kentucky 128, Indiana 118
Game 2 @ Indiana:  Indiana 120, Kentucky 115
Game 3 @ Kentucky:  Kentucky 130, Indiana 111
Game 4 @ Kentucky:  Kentucky 105, Indiana 104
Game 5 @ Indiana:  Indiana 116, Kentucky 97
Game 6 @ Kentucky:  Indiana 107, Kentucky 89
Game 7 @ Indiana:  Indiana 120, Kentucky 111

(2) Miami Floridians vs. (4) Minnesota Pipers:
Floridians win series 4-3
Game 1 @ Miami:  Miami 119, Minnesota 110
Game 2 @ Miami:  Minnesota 106, Miami 99
Game 3 @ Minnesota:  Minnesota 109, Miami 93
Game 4 @ Minnesota:  Miami 116, Minnesota 109
Game 5 @ Miami:  Miami 122, Minnesota 107
Game 6 @ Minnesota:  Minnesota 105, Miami 100
Game 7 @ Miami:  Miami 137, Minnesota 128

Division Finals

(1) Indiana Pacers vs. (2) Miami Floridians:
Pacers win series 4-1
Game 1 @ Indiana:  Indiana 126, Miami 110
Game 2 @ Indiana:  Indiana 131, Miami 116
Game 3 @ Miami:  Indiana 119, Miami 105
Game 4 @ Miami:  Miami 114, Indiana 110
Game 5 @ Indiana:  Indiana 127, Miami 105

ABA Finals

(1) Oakland Oaks VS. (1) Indiana Pacers:
Oaks win series 4-1
Game 1 (Apr 30) @ Oakland:  Oakland 123, Indiana 114
Game 2 (May 2) @ Oakland:  Indiana 150, Oakland 122
Game 3 (May 3) @ Indiana:  Oakland 134, Indiana 126
Game 4 (May 5) @ Indiana:  Oakland 144, Indiana 117
Game 5 (May 7) @ Oakland:  Oakland 135, Indiana 131

External links
RememberTheABA.com page on 1969 ABA playoffs 
Basketball-Reference.com's 1969 ABA Playoffs page

Playoffs
American Basketball Association playoffs